General elections were held in East Germany on 16 November 1958. There were 466 deputies in the Volkskammer, including 66 from East Berlin who were not directly elected. All were candidates of the single-list National Front, dominated by the Socialist Unity Party of Germany. The list received the approval of 99.9% of voters, with turnout reported to be 98.9%.

Results

References

1958 in East Germany
Elections in East Germany
1958 elections in Germany
East Germany
East German general election